Ronan Sheehan (born 1968) is an Irish former hurler, Gaelic footballer and politician. At club level he played with Mallow and Avondhu and was a member of the Cork senior teams as a dual player. Sheehan was also an elected representative with Cork County Council.

Sporting career

Sheehan first played Gaelic football and hurling with Thomas Davis, the underage section of the Mallow club. After winning the Cork MFC title in 1984, he subsequently progressed onto the club's top adult team in both codes and was part of the Mallow team that won the Cork IFC title in 1992. He also earned selection with Avondhu and was part of the divisional team that won the 1996 Cork SHC.

Sheehan first appeared on the inter-county scene as a dual player at minor level and won Munster MFC and Munster MHC medals in 1985 and 1986 but lost three All-Ireland finals in that grade in the space of 12 months. He was an unused substitute when Cork beat Kilkenny in the 1988 All-Ireland U21HC final. Sheehan captained the Cork junior football team to the 1993 All-Ireland JFC title after a defeat of Laois in the final. He became a dual All-Ireland junior-winner when he came on as a substitute for Cork's defeat of Kilkenny in the 1994 All-Ireland JHC final. Sheehan also made a number of appearances for the Cork senior teams in both codes in a number of tournament and National League games.

Sheehan retired from the club scene in 2006 but immediately became involved in coaching and team management. He managed the Mallow team to the Cork PIFC title in 2007.

Political career

Sheehan was elected to Cork County Council as a Labour Party candidate in the 2009 local elections. He was also elected to Mallow Town Council. Sheehan lost his seat on the County Council after one term.

Honours

Player

Thomas Davis
Cork Minor Football Championship: 1984

Mallow
Cork Intermediate Football Championship: 1992
Cork Intermediate Football Championship: 2001

Avondhu
Cork Senior Hurling Championship: 1996

Cork
All-Ireland Junior Football Championship: 1993
All-Ireland Junior Hurling Championship: 1994
Munster Junior Football Championship: 1993
Munster Junior Hurling Championship: 1992, 1994
All-Ireland Under-21 Hurling Championship: 1988
Munster Under-21 Hurling Championship: 1988
Munster Minor Hurling Championship: 1986
Munster Minor Football Championship: 1985, 1986

Manager

Mallow
Cork Premier Intermediate Football Championship: 2007

References

1968 births
Living people
Dual players
Mallow hurlers
Mallow Gaelic footballers
Avondhu hurlers
Cork inter-county hurlers
Cork inter-county Gaelic footballers
Gaelic football managers
Irish sportsperson-politicians
Local councillors in County Cork
People from Mallow, County Cork
Politicians from County Cork